
Gmina Sadlinki is a rural gmina (administrative district) in Kwidzyn County, Pomeranian Voivodeship, in northern Poland.

Population of Gmina Sadlinki throughout the Years.
2006 - 5,673,
2007 - 5,701,
2008 - 5,724,
2009 - 5,792,
2010 - 5,825,
2011 - 5,830,
2012 - 5,856,
2013 - 5,846,
2014 - 5,850,
2015 - 5,835,
2016 - 5,841,
2017 - 5,882,
2018 - 5,880,
2019 - 5,884,
2020 - 5,894,
2021 - 5,909,
2022 - 5,895,

Villages
Gmina Sadlinki contains the villages and settlements of Białki, Bronisławowo, Glina, Grabowo, Kaniczki, Karpiny, Kółeczko, Krążkowo, Nebrowo Małe, Nebrowo Wielkie, Okrągła Łąka, Olszanica, Rusinowo, Sadlinki and Wiśliny.

Neighbouring gminas
Gmina Sadlinki is bordered by the town of Kwidzyn and by the gminas of Gardeja, Gniew, Grudziądz, Kwidzyn, Nowe and Rogóźno.

References
Polish official population figures 2006

Sadlinki
Kwidzyn County